Backyard Farms is a Madison, Maine-based agricultural company specializing in massive greenhouses to produce vine-ripened tomatoes. It had been owned by Devonshire Investors, a Boston-based branch of Fidelity Investments but was sold in June 2017 to a Canadian produce company, Mastronardi Produce of Ontario.

History 
The company was started in 2004. In 2007, the company's first  greenhouse was built in Madison, Maine, making it the largest building by volume in the state. It covers the area of 20 football fields. The 240,000 plants grow up to 10 feet tall and are projected to yield 1 million tomatoes each week. Their second greenhouse, connected to the first, was built in 2009. The combined area was then . Plants are grown in rock wool and pollinated by bumblebees that are kept inside the greenhouses. Rainwater that sheds off the greenhouse roofs is recycled to supplement the water used to irrigate the plants.

Although the tomatoes originally had been a specialty variety called "Backyard Beauty", they had been replaced with other, undisclosed varieties. There had been plans for the operation to expand to include peppers, eggplants, cucumbers, herbs, and strawberries.

References

External links 

2004 establishments in Maine
American companies established in 2004
Companies based in Portland, Maine
Agriculture in Maine
Agriculture companies established in 2004
Sustainable agriculture